Gilles Bettmer (born 31 March 1989) is a Luxembourgian professional footballer who plays as a defensive midfielder for FC Differdange 03.

Club career
Bettmer was born in Esch-sur-Alzette. He joined SC Freiburg II in 2004 from local side AS Differdange and signed in January 2010 than for Eintracht Trier. After a half year with Eintracht Trier announced on 26 May 2010 his return to his youth club AS Differdange and signed a three years contract.

International career
Bettmer made his debut for the Luxembourg national team in a November 2005 friendly match against Canada and by his last cap in 2013 had earned 58 caps, scoring one goal. He played in four FIFA World Cup qualification matches.

Career statistics

Scores and results list Luxembourg's goal tally first, score column indicates score after each Bettmer goal.

References

External links
 

1989 births
Living people
Sportspeople from Esch-sur-Alzette
Luxembourgian footballers
Association football midfielders
Luxembourg international footballers
Luxembourg National Division players
SC Freiburg players
SV Eintracht Trier 05 players
FC Differdange 03 players
Luxembourgian expatriate footballers
Luxembourgian expatriate sportspeople in Germany
Expatriate footballers in Germany